Solovyovo is a rural locality (a village) in Nizhneyerogodskoye Rural Settlement, Velikoustyugsky District, Vologda Oblast, Russia. The population was 13 as of 2002.

Geography 
Solovyovo is located 41 km southwest of Veliky Ustyug (the district's administrative centre) by road. Ruposovo is the nearest rural locality.

References 

Rural localities in Velikoustyugsky District